The 1995–96 season was the 61st season in existence for Real Zaragoza. The club competed in La Liga for 18th consecutive year, Copa del Rey and UEFA Cup Winners' Cup.

Summary
During summer Alfonso Solans in his 4th season as President, reinforced the squad with several players such as young forwards Fernando Morientes and Dani García whom  arrived from Albacete Balompié and Real Madrid respectively the latter on loan. On the contrary striker Juan Eduardo Esnaider, Brazilian right-back Defender Cafu and Defensive midfielder Dario Franco left the club, another transfer in was midfielder Sergio Berti from River Plate and defender Paqui from Tenerife. Meanwhile in his 5th season as head coah Victor Fernández did not repeat the same good performances of past seasons, along the sale of Esnaider came the ageing of Pardeza and Higuera on the offensive line prompting a transition phase with Morientes and Dani.

The team collapsed in league to mid table spots during the entire campaign even with the arrivals of Gustavo Adrián López (the most expensive club transfer ever) and Sebastian Rambert on winter. Also in Copa del Rey the team was early eliminated by underdogs Espanyol in quarterfinals. In UEFA Cup Winners' Cup the incumbent champions reached the quarterfinals stage losing the series against Deportivo La Coruña. Finally, in 1995 UEFA Super Cup the team was defeated by AFC Ajax including a 0-4 result.

The season high mark for the squad were the decent performance of 20-yr-old striker Fernando Morientes scoring 18 goals during the season.

Squad

Transfers

Winter

Competitions

La Liga

League table

Position by round

Matches

Copa del Rey

Third round
bye as 1995-96 UEFA Cup Winners' Cup qualified team.

Fourth round
bye as 1995-96 UEFA Cup Winners' Cup qualified team.

Fifth round
bye as 1995-96 UEFA Cup Winners' Cup qualified team.

Eightfinals

Quarter-finals

UEFA Supercup

UEFA Cup Winners' Cup

Quarterfinals

Statistics

Players statistics

See also
  BDFutbol

References

Real Zaragoza
Real Zaragoza seasons